Sankaty (a.k.a. HMCS Sankaty, a.k.a. Charles A. Dunning) was a propeller-driven steamer that served as a ferry to Martha's Vineyard and Nantucket in Massachusetts; in Rockland, Maine; Stamford, Connecticut and Oyster Bay, Long Island in the United States from 1911 to 1940. During World War II, the ship was requisitioned by the Royal Canadian Navy for service as a minelayer and maintenance vessel along the Canadian Atlantic coast. Following the war the ship returned to a ferry, working the  Wood Islands, Prince Edward Island and Caribou, Nova Scotia route in Canada from 1947 until 1964. While being towed to the breaker's yard, the ship sank off the coast of Nova Scotia on October 27, 1964.

Description
Sankaty was designed by Chauncey G. Whiton. The ship had a gross register tonnage (GRT) of 657 tons. Sankaty rolled much more than the sidewheelers that preceded it. Because of this, the ladies' parlor and toilet was situated on the upper deck in a location to reduce the motion and vibration while on the rough waters of Vineyard Sound.

The ship was powered by a triple expansion engine fed by steam from four Almy water-tube boilers turning the two propellers.

Career

Martha's Vineyard and Nantucket Ferry

Sankaty  built by the Fore River Works in Quincy, Massachusetts with the yard number 192. The ship was launched on 2 February 1911 and completed in April. From her construction in 1911 until 1924, Sankaty operated as a ferry for the New Bedford, Martha's Vineyard & Nantucket Steamboat Company, serving the islands of Martha's Vineyard and Nantucket. While not the first propeller-driven steamer to serve these islands (which was Helen Augusta which substituted for  during the American Civil War) it marked the end of the paddlewheel steamer era for the Cape and Islands.

On 20 February, 1917 she went ashore on Wilburs Point at Sconticut Neck near New Bedford, Massachusetts. Refloated, repaired and returned to service.

1924 fire, Maine and New York Ferry Service
On the night of June 30, 1924, Sankaty caught fire and burned down to her steel hull while tied up overnight in New Bedford harbor. She drifted across the Acushnet River in flames and crashed into the whaling ship , setting her on fire as well.

Sankaty was raised, sold and rebuilt with an open deck for use as a car ferry in Rockland, Maine. Owned by the New England Steamship Company, the vessel was sold to Snow Marine Company in 1925. In 1931, the vessel was sold again, this time to the Stamford-Oyster Bay Ferries Corporation to serve as a ferry between Stamford, Connecticut, and Oyster Bay, Long Island.

Canadian service and fate

In 1940 Sankaty was purchased by Northumberland Ferries of Prince Edward Island, Canada, but before she began service she was requisitioned by the Royal Canadian Navy that year to serve in World War II as a minelayer, HMCS Sankaty. The ship was commissioned on 24 September 1940 at Halifax, Nova Scotia and was also used as a maintenance vessel. With the end of the war, the ship was paid off on 18 August 1945.

After the war she was renamed Charles A. Dunning, and served from 1946 until 1964 in the waters between Wood Islands, Prince Edward Island and Caribou, Nova Scotia. During this period her capacity was twenty-three cars and four trucks. She was sold for scrap in 1964, but sank en route to Sydney, Nova Scotia on October 27, 1964.

The new Sankaty 

In 1994, The Woods Hole, Martha's Vineyard and Nantucket Steamship Authority began service of a new freight vessel Sankaty, named after this steamer.

Notes 

Ferries of Massachusetts
Maritime history of the United States
Martha's Vineyard
Ferries of Prince Edward Island
Ferries of Nova Scotia
Auxiliary ships of the Royal Canadian Navy
Shipwrecks of the Nova Scotia coast
1911 ships
Maritime incidents in 1964
Transportation in Dukes County, Massachusetts
Transportation in Nantucket, Massachusetts
Transport in Kings County, Prince Edward Island